Intercessor: Another Rock 'N' Roll Nightmare is a horror film produced in 2005 and is the sequel to Rock 'n' Roll Nightmare. It was written by Chris Allen and directed by Benn McGuire and Jacob Windatt.  The film stars Jon Mikl Thor as a character called the "Intercessor" who travels to the present time to do battle with the demon Mephisto and the monster Zompira.  The film is a low budget affair but appealed to Jon Mikl Thor's fan base.

Synopsis 
After ridding the Earth of the forces of darkness inhabiting an isolated Canadian farmhouse, The Intercessor must now do battle with new and just as deadly forces of evil.

Cast 

 Chris Allen as Famine 
 Craig Bowlsby as Mephisto
 Daye Ellingham as War
 Melissa Ellingham as Laura 
 Amy Lee as Julie's Sister
 Sharon McDonald as Julie 
 Brad Pope as Harry
 Rob Scattergood as Pestilence
 Jon Mikl Thor as The Intercessor

Reception 
Dread Central was critical of Intercessor, stating that "No matter how intentionally campy Intercessor: Another Rock ‘N’ Roll Nightmare may have intended to be, the truth is that the film is so damn bad that even the intentionally campy stuff comes across as being unintentionally awful." Something Awful and DVD Talk also panned the film, with the latter stating that fans of Jon Mikl Thor would "want it for the music and the extra features but I can't see anyone else wanting to subject themselves to this one".

References

External links
 
 film review: http://www.braineater.com/other_hell/fifth_circle/intercessor.html

2005 films
Canadian supernatural horror films
Canadian rock music films
The Devil in film
English-language Canadian films
2005 horror films
2000s English-language films
2000s Canadian films